Georgios Lykoudis (born ) is a retired Greek male volleyball player and volleyball coach currently coaching Panachaiki. He has 154 appearances with Greece men's national volleyball team. He played for Olympiacos for 6 years (1988-1996), winning 6 consecutive Greek Championships, 4 Greek Cups and the 1995–96 CEV Cup Winners Cup. In 1993 (while still an active player) he became head coach of Olympiacos Women's Volleyball Team and coached the team for 3 years. In 2002 he became assistant coach of Olympiacos. In 2006-07 he was appointed head coach Olympiacos Women's Volleyball Team for the second time and in 2009 he became head coach of Greece women's national volleyball team.

Clubs
  Olympiacos (1988-1996)

References

1964 births
Living people
Greek men's volleyball players
Olympiacos S.C. players
Olympiacos Women's Volleyball coaches
Volleyball players from Thessaloniki